Grove Farm is a 36.5 hectare (90.2 acre) biological Site of Special Scientific Interest in Somerset, notified in 1989.

This site comprises an extensive area of unimproved mesotrophic grassland, a habitat which is now uncommon in Britain.

References 

Sites of Special Scientific Interest in Somerset
Sites of Special Scientific Interest notified in 1989